Check Man is an arcade video game released by American company Zilec-Zenitone in 1982. While being a fast-paced action game, there are puzzle elements to the gameplay. The game uses the Namco Galaxian arcade board.

Gameplay
The screen is broken up into 14 x 13 tiles or checks. When the player passes over the tiles, they disappear so each tile can only be walked over once per level. Some tiles are taken up by skull and crossbones which kill the player if walked into. The skulls turn to time bombs one at a time and the player must walk over them to defuse them before they explode. They must avoid the skulls and make sure they do not block off a possible future route by circling it. Some tiles are also flags which can be collected for bonus points. When all skulls have turned to bombs and been defused, the level is complete and begins again at a harder level. As the game develops, stomping boots are introduced that move around the playing area. These are also deadly to the player.

Legacy
There were no official ports to home systems but Check Man was cloned as Danger UXB (Micro Power) for the Acorn Electron and BBC Micro, Timebomb (CDS Microsystems) for the ZX Spectrum, Gridtrap for the Commodore 64, and Kick It (Aackosoft) for MSX.

References

External links

1982 video games
Arcade video games
Arcade-only video games
North America-exclusive video games
Video games developed in the United States
Multiplayer and single-player video games
Video games about bomb disposal